St Joseph's Church is a Roman Catholic church in Subiaco, Western Australia. The church opened on 12 August 1934. It was designed in the Interwar Gothic style by architect Edgar Le Blond Henderson.

References

External links
 
 

Roman Catholic churches in Perth, Western Australia
Roman Catholic churches completed in 1934
Subiaco, Western Australia
State Register of Heritage Places in the City of Subiaco
Subiaco
1934 establishments in Australia
20th-century Roman Catholic church buildings in Australia